The collared brown lemur (Eulemur collaris), also known as the red-collared brown lemur or red-collared lemur, is a medium-sized strepsirrhine primate and one of twelve species of brown lemur in the family Lemuridae.  It is only found in south-eastern Madagascar.  Like most species of lemur, it is arboreal, moving quadrupedally and occasionally leaping from tree to tree.  Like other brown lemurs, this species is cathemeral (active during the day and the night), lives in social groups, primarily eats fruit, exhibits sexual dichromatism, and does not demonstrate female dominance.  The species is listed as Endangered by the International Union for Conservation of Nature (IUCN) and is threatened primarily by habitat loss.

Taxonomy
Together with the twelve other true lemurs (genus Eulemur), the collared brown lemur (E. collaris) is a type of lemur  belonging to the family Lemuridae.  Collectively, lemurs (infraorder Lemuriformes) are classified as strepsirrhine primates.  Originally listed as a subspecies of the common brown lemur (E. fulvus), the collared brown lemur was promoted to full species status in 2001 by biological anthropologist Colin Groves.

Anatomy and physiology
The only form of sexual dimorphism exhibited by the collared brown lemur is dichromatism. The following table illustrates the coloration differences between the sexes:

In the wild, the collared brown lemur's range does not overlap with other brown lemurs, so it is rarely confused with other species.  However, in captivity it can be easily confused with the gray-headed lemur (Eulemur cinereiceps) due to similar coloration.  The male collared brown lemur can be distinguished by their cream-colored or rufous beards, whereas the male gray-headed lemur has a white beard.  Females of these two species are nearly indistinguishable, even though genetic analyses support full species status for both taxa. In Berenty Reserve, the species has hybridized with the red lemur.

Ecology
Found in tropical moist lowland and montane forests in southeastern Madagascar, the collared brown lemur occurs west to the forests of Kalambatritra and in the south from Tôlanaro north to the Mananara River. The Mananara River is the boundary between the ranges of the collared brown lemur and the gray-headed lemur to the north. The collared brown lemur can be found in the littoral forests of Mandena Conservation Zone, Sainte Luce Reserve, and Andohahela National Park.

In its environment, the collared brown lemur acts as a seed disperser, and is especially critical for the dispersal of large-seeded fruiting trees within its range.  However, there is no evidence that these relationships are coevolutionary and instead these lemurs may be the last remaining seed dispersers for these tree species following the extinction of larger frugivorous birds and subfossil lemurs.

Behavior
Very little is known about the natural history of this species.  It shows great dietary flexibility, feeding on fruits from over 100 plant species. It is also cathemeral (active both day and night throughout the year), a trait seen in some other members of its genus.  Research has suggested that metabolic dietary-related needs are the leading factor behind this behavior, although the specific hours of this activity pattern can shift based on lunar luminosity and seasonal changes in the photoperiod (day length).  Previous studies had ruled out effects of predators on the expression of this trait, and instead pointed to fruit availability and fiber intake as more important factors.

The collared brown lemur tends to live in social groups that are multi-male/multi-female, with groups ranging in size from two to seventeen individuals.  Population densities are estimated at 14 individuals/km2, and it appears to be common within its range.  Females give birth to one offspring between October and December, and male involvement with the young has been observed.  Female dominance, a common behavioral trait in many lemur species but uncommon in most true lemurs, has not been observed in this species.

Brown lemurs at Berenty (hybrid E. fulvus x collaris)  show linear hierarchy, adult female dominance, and the presence of conciliatory behavior after aggressions. Additionally, stress levels (measured via self-directed behaviors) decrease at the increase of the hierarchical position of individuals within the social group and reconciliation is able to bring stress down to the baseline levels.

Conservation status

The collared brown lemur was listed as Endangered in the IUCN Red List assessment. Its greatest threat is habitat loss from slash-and-burn agriculture and charcoal production.  It is also hunted for food and captured for the local pet trade.  However, populations of the collared brown lemur have been successfully sustained in captivity and continue to provide a safeguard against their extinction.

A small group of collared brown lemurs was introduced in the 1980s into the Berenty Private Reserve and has since hybridized with introduced red-fronted lemurs.

References

True lemurs
Mammals described in 1817
Fauna of the Madagascar lowland forests
Fauna of the Madagascar subhumid forests
Taxa named by Étienne Geoffroy Saint-Hilaire